Jean Marie MacArthur ( Faircloth; December 28, 1898 – January 22, 2000) was the second wife of U.S. Army General of the Army Douglas MacArthur.

Early life and education 
Born Jean Marie Faircloth in Nashville, Tennessee, she was the daughter of Edward C. Faircloth, a banker. After her parents divorced when she was eight, her mother took her to live with her grandparents in Murfreesboro. Her grandfather, a former captain in the Confederate army, instilled in her a love of uniforms. She attended Ward-Belmont College in Nashville, but graduated from Soule College in Murfreesboro. When her father died, she inherited a large fortune and travelled extensively.

Marriage 
Despite the age difference — she was nearly nineteen years younger than he — they began a permanent relationship in Manila, and married in New York City on April 30, 1937, during Gen. MacArthur's trip home to build support for the defense of the Philippines. This was to be Gen. MacArthur's last trip to the mainland United States for the next 14 years, when he was relieved from duty by President Truman. His only other visits to U.S. soil between 1937 and 1951 were a 1944 strategy meeting in Honolulu, Hawaii with President Roosevelt and Admiral Nimitz and a 1950 meeting with President Truman on Wake Island.

Jean was MacArthur's second wife and he described her as his "constant friend, sweetheart, and devoted support." They had one son, Arthur MacArthur IV (1938–), and were married until Douglas' death in 1964.

Wartime 
Jean MacArthur was with her husband when the Japanese attacked the Philippines and went with him to the island of Corregidor in Manila's harbor.  Even when the island was attacked, she refused to leave her husband.  Only when President Roosevelt ordered the MacArthurs to leave did they go to Australia.

Charity work 
After her husband's death she helped with the Metropolitan Opera and other charities.  In her later years, she often gave speeches on her late husband's military career.  President Ronald Reagan awarded her the Medal of Freedom in 1988 and the Philippine government gave her its Legion of Merit in 1993.

Death 
Mrs. MacArthur died of natural causes in Lenox Hill Hospital in Manhattan at age 101. She is entombed with her husband in the rotunda of the MacArthur Memorial in Norfolk, Virginia, the hometown of Gen. MacArthur's mother.

References

 .
 .

1898 births
2000 deaths
People from Nashville, Tennessee
People from Manhattan
American centenarians
Jean
Ward–Belmont College alumni
Presidential Medal of Freedom recipients
Women centenarians